The Journal of Chemical Crystallography is a peer-reviewed scientific journal publishing original (primary) research and review articles on crystallography and spectroscopy. It is published monthly by Springer Science+Business Media.

The editor-in-chief of Journal of Chemical Crystallography is W.T. Pennington. According to the Journal Citation Reports, the journal has a 2020 impact factor of 0.603.

Scope
The Journal of Chemical Crystallography covers crystal chemistry and physics and their relation to problems of molecular structure; structural studies of solids, liquids, gases, and solutions involving spectroscopic, spectrometric, X-ray, and electron and neutron diffraction; and theoretical studies.

Abstracting and indexing 
Journal of Chemical Crystallography is abstracted and indexed in the following databases:
 Chemical Abstracts Service - CASSI
 Science Citation Index - Web of Science
 Scopus
 GeoRef
 EMBiology

References

External links
 

Monthly journals
Springer Science+Business Media academic journals
Chemistry journals
English-language journals
Crystallography journals
Publications established in 1971